The Honourable William Frederick Ormiston AO QC (6 October 1935 – 13 December 2014) was a Court of Appeal justice at the Supreme Court of Victoria in Australia.

Ormiston was educated at Melbourne Grammar School, the University of Melbourne (where he was business manager on the inaugural issue of the Melbourne University Law Review) and the London School of Economics. He took silk in 1975. Following his elevation to the bench in November 1983, sat on the Supreme Court for 22 years, with 10 of those on the Court of Appeal.

References

Judges of the Supreme Court of Victoria
2014 deaths
1935 births
Place of birth missing